Shakira Duncan (born October 1, 1989) is a Jamaican footballer who plays as a forward for Israeli club Maccabi Holon FC and the Jamaica women's national team.

College career
Duncan attended the Oral Roberts University, the Darton State College, and the University of West Florida.

International career
Duncan represented Jamaica at two CONCACAF Women's U-20 Championship editions (2006 and 2008).

Despite scoring in Jamaica's last home friendly game before the 2019 FIFA Women's World Cup, a 3–1 win over Panama, Duncan was left out of the 23-player squad for the final tournament.

International goals
Scores and results list Jamaica's goal tally first

References

External links 
 Shakira Duncan at The Israel Football Association website
 

1989 births
Living people
Sportspeople from Kingston, Jamaica
Jamaican women's footballers
Women's association football forwards
Oral Roberts Golden Eagles women's soccer players
West Florida Argonauts women's soccer players
Knattspyrnufélag Reykjavíkur players
Maccabi Kishronot Hadera F.C. players
F.C. Ramat HaSharon players
Maccabi Holon F.C. (women) players
Shakira Duncan
Ligat Nashim players
Jamaica women's international footballers
Jamaican expatriate women's footballers
Jamaican expatriate sportspeople in the United States
Expatriate women's soccer players in the United States
Jamaican expatriate sportspeople in Iceland
Expatriate women's footballers in Iceland
Jamaican expatriate sportspeople in Israel
Expatriate women's footballers in Israel